An incomplete list of schools in the province of West Flanders, Belgium.

B
Bruges
Beernem
Land- en Tuinbouwinstituut 't Brugse Vrije
St. Lutgartinstituut
Blankenberge
Koninklijk Atheneum Maerlant Blankenberge-de Haan
Middenschool van het Gemeenschapsonderwijs Maerlant
St. Pieterscollege - St. Jozefshandelsschool
Bruges
Assebroek
Koninklijk Atheneum III
Middenschool V Assebroek - St. Kruis
Onze-Lieve-Vrouwecollege
Bruges (Centre)
College of Europe
Hotel- en Toerismeschool Spermalie
KHBO voor Verpleegkunde St.-Jan - St.-Jozef
Koninklijk Atheneum I 
Lyceum Hemelsdaele
Middenschool Brugge Centrum
St. Andreasinstituut Humaniora
St. Franciscus-Xaveriusinstituut
St. Jozefinstituut Handel en Toerisme
St. Jozefinstituut Humaniora
St. Leocollege
Stedelijke Academie voor Schone Kunsten
Technisch Instituut Heilige Familie  
Vrij Technisch Instituut - Brugge
Vrij Technisch Instituut - Brugge Middenschool 
Lissewege
Onze-Lieve-Vrouw Ter Duinen 1
Onze-Lieve-Vrouw Ter Duinen 2
St. Andries
Abdijschool van Zevenkerken
Koninklijk Atheneum II
Koninklijk Technisch Atheneum Vesaliusinstituut Oostende
Onze-Lieve-Vrouw-Hemelvaart Instituut
St. Lodewijkscollege
Vrij Technisch Instituut - Brugge
Vrij Technisch Instituut - Brugge Middenschool
St. Kruis
Instituut Mariawende-Blydhove
Middelbare Rudolf Steinerschool Vlaanderen
St. Andreaslyceum
St. Michiels
Brood- en banketbakkerijschool Ter Groene Poorte
Hotelschool en Slagerijschool Ter Groene Poorte
Immaculata-Instituut
KHBO voor Verpleegkunde St.-Michiel
Koninklijk Atheneum II or Koninklijk Atheneum Vijverhof
Koninklijk Technisch Atheneum
Vrij Handels- en Sportinstituut St. Michiels
Knokke-Heist
Koninklijk Atheneum
Middenschool
St. Bernardusinstituut
St. Jozefsinstituut Lyceum
Onze-Lieve-Vrouw Ter Duinen 1
Onze-Lieve-Vrouw Ter Duinen 2
Oostkamp
Middenschool St. Pieter
Torhout
Koninklijk Technisch Atheneum
Middenschool St. Rembert 1
Middenschool St. Rembert 2
Middenschool St. Rembert 3
St. Jozefscollege
St. Jozefsinstituut
Technisch Instituut St. Vincentius
Vrij Technisch Instituut St. Aloysius
Vrij Land- en Tuinbouwinstituut
Zedelgem
Spes Nostra Instituut

D
Diksmuide
Diksmuide
Koninklijk Technisch Atheneum
Middenschool
St. Aloysiuscollege
Vrij Technisch Instituut
Koekelare
Instituut St. Martinus
Koninklijk Technisch Atheneum
Kortemark
Margareta-Maria-Instituut

O
Ostend
Bredene
Koninklijk Technisch Atheneum II Ensorinstituut Oostende
Koninklijk Werk IBIS
De Haan
Koninklijk Atheneum Maerlant Blankenberge-de Haan
Gistel
Koninklijk Technisch Atheneum
St. Godelievecollege
Ichtegem
St. Godelievecollege
Ostend
HBO voor verpleegkunde St. Jan - St. Jozef
Koninklijk Atheneum I
Koninklijk Technisch Atheneum I Oostende
Koninklijk Technisch Atheneum II Ensorinstituut Oostende
Koninklijk Technisch Atheneum Vesaliusinstituut Oostende
Middenschool I
Maritiem Instituut 'Mercator'
Onze-Lieve-Vrouwecollege
Pegasus - Koninklijk Atheneum II
St. Andreas Middenschool
St. Andreasinstituut
St. Jozefsinstituut
Vrij Technisch Instituut

R
Roeselare
Ardooie
Instituut Heilige Kindsheid Ardooie
Ingelmunster
Instituut Edelweiss
Izegem
Instituut de Pelichy Ave Maria
Koninklijk Atheneum
Middenschool
Middenschool J. de Pelichy
Middenschool de Pelichy Ave Maria
St. Jozefscollege
Vrij Technisch Instituut Izegem
Lichtervelde
Middenschool St. Rembert 1
Roeselare
Barnum

Buildings and structures in West Flanders
West Flanders
West Flanders